'Senior theatre' is a form of drama designed specifically for older adults, where seniors are actively involved.

In 1999, there were 79 companies in the US. As of 2016, there are over 800 groups with many around the world.

Many theatre performers want to be on stage when they are older. A good number have never acted before, others have performed when they were young and want to do it again. Some have acted all their lives and they know the joy of performing. Seniors have time to explore the theatre.

Different types of Senior Theatre 
There are many different types of Senior Theatre including acting classes, live theatre viewing, play reading, improvisation, storytelling or theatre productions that are readers theatre, short plays, variety shows, plays from life stories of participants, musical theatre, and topics facing seniors, among others.

Offstage, seniors also work as solo performers, playwrights, or they act in films and commercials. Many help backstage, as ushers, or in the box office. They also take classes in all elements of theatre in colleges, universities, and in the community.

Techniques of Senior Theatre 
Senior Theatre uses techniques that accommodate the abilities of older adults. The most popular techniques in the field are readers theatre and script-in-hand performances. They allow actors to have easy access to their lines and blocking without having to be concerned about the fear of forgetting. Also, Senior Theatre can be intergenerational by including actors of all ages on stage or in the audience.

Benefits 
 The performers range from professional to amateur in both rural and urban settings. Ages usually span between 50 and 90 years but most are in their late 60s and 70s. There are many benefits derived from Senior Theatre including physical, mental, psychological, social, and cultural growth. It builds vital social connections for often isolated seniors.

Vintage Improv as a means to create intergenerational communication 
Vintage Improv is a term coined by Miki Manting and refers to Improv performed by people who are at least 50 years old. In Improv theater, it is often difficult for vintage improvisers to compete for opportunities to perform. At Improv theaters  where casts are largely made up of improvisers in their 20s and early 30s vintage improvisers often experience the phenomenon of invisibility. Where other underrepresented groups are actively accommodated, age over 50 is not seen as a demographic of concern. The  phenomenon of invisibility often carries over into the considerations around casting. Although there are notable exceptions with regard to specific improv theater policies, many Vintage improvisers have been they are poor listeners and do not respond appropriately in improv scenes. Seeing this important improv skill as lacking results as being dismissed as less competent. In truth is very different and the phenomenon disappears when Vintage improvisers perform together. Their broader life experience allows vintage improvisers to draw and make connections that are more nuanced and informed.

Nonetheless, it can be difficult for older people to be accepted in younger-oriented theaters. One way of overcoming the access problem is for older improvisers to form "over 50" troupes and then create their own opportunities to perform. Lack of experience in producing troupe shows and larger performance opportunities can present a barrier, However, the experience of Elderberry Jam proves that the life experience of organizing in a career outside the field of entertainment combined with being open to boldly setting goals can lead to remarkably successful outcomes. It can be especially helpful for cross generational collaboration when vintage troupes seek out active involvement with improvisers of younger generations. One example employing this model is Elderberry Jam Improv of Cambridge Massachusetts and their long-standing monthly show called "Jammin' with the Elderberries".

Vintage Improv Troupes
Elderberry Jam Improv (EJI) was the first troupe in the world to bill itself vintage. Tongue in cheek their promotional material refers to the troupe as the "World's Finest Vintage Improv". The ensemble includes Ann "Crim" Crimmins, Roy Doolittle, Wayne Mastin, Hilary Fabre, Eric V. Fields, David Silberman, Miki Manting. EJI also benefitted in parallel from the historic example of New Tricks which was founded in 2003. Although no longer active, New Tricks, provided the historic context for over 50 improv troupes in New England. Troupe members boasted over 462 years of combined experience. Founded by the late Mike Martin & Jeanne Hillson. New Tricks longtime members included Bari Olevsky, Don Buell, Amy Rubin, Joan Larason and Lanny Rubin.

A deliberately planned outreach for EJI is the production of a longstanding monthly improv show at The Center for Arts at the Armory in Somerville Massachusetts. This show has remained a favorite launching point for new improv troupes whose members are largely in the 20-35 age range. The end of show "Jam" gives all generations an opportunity to play together in a low stress setting.

Vintage Improv and the Vintage Improv Festival
In 2018, in conjunction with ImprovBoston, the world's first Vintage Improv Festival was produced in Boston. The intellectual property of Miki Manting, the one day Festival manifested as a tag onto the end of the Boston Improv Festival. It drew over 50 experienced solo vintage improvisers and existing Troupes  from points as far away as Austin, Oklahoma City, Sarasota, northernmost Maine, Detroit and the Twin Cities.  Selected Vintage Improv Troupes included The Early Bird Special of Sarasota Florida, HATS from Hadley Massachusetts, and  Elderberry Jam Improv. Additionally two duos, The Grown Ups from Oklahoma City,  and In Our Prime from Austin Texas performed at  this historic event. A longstanding short-form troupe called Kamikaze from Montpelier Maine and  number of brave solo improvisers were also selected to perform in specially curated teams for what turned out to be a packed Main Stage Theater at ImprovBoston.

Due to broad interest, The world's second Vintage Improv Festival is set to unfold in September 2019. Expanded to 3 days. VIF is now produced by Vintage Improv Festival Inc, a 501(c)(3) nonprofit corporation with a mission to provide festival performance opportunities for the underserved senior age demographic while also providing the health benefits of  laughter for the broader community. Special focus is on senior citizens and children. Free early shows are provided for youngsters and their families.

The 2019 festival draws from an even wider geographic range than in 2018 including all regions of the US, Canada and Europe. Selected Vintage Troupes for the 2019 VIF  include DUO DADS from Toronto, Knee Jerkz from Portland Oregon, Ramen on Sunday from San Antonio Texas, and Randomly Chosen from the Twin Cities in Minnesota. Again brave solo improvisers are traveling from as far away as San Diego, Portland Oregon, Denver Colorado, Toronto and Belgium.

References 

Curtain Call — Senior Theater's Dramatic Growth, Aging Well Magazine

Community theatre
Theatrical genres
Improvisational theatre